Ludwik Chałubiński (2 August 1860, in Warsaw – 17 April 1933, in Zakopane) was a Polish Alpinist and engineer.

Son of Tytus Chałubiński, Ludwik started climbing the Tatras already at the age of 14, initially with his father and then with his friends. In 1877 together with guides Wojciech Roj and Maciej Sieczka he made the first ascent of the Mięguszowiecki Szczyt Wielki. He was also the first to reach the summit of Młynarz (1885), the second to reach Baranie Rogi (1884) and the third on top of the Durny Szczyt (1881). He also climbed the Alps, where he was the first Pole to climb the Großglockner and Aletschhorn.

References 

 Zofia Radwańska-Paryska, Witold Henryk Paryski: Wielka encyklopedia tatrzańska. Poronin: Wydawnictwo Górskie, 2004. .
 Tytus Chałubiński listy 1840–1889 w oprac. Anieli Szwejcerowej, red. prof. Zygmunt Kolankowski (Wrocław, Ossolineum, 1970).

1860 births
1933 deaths
Polish mountain climbers
Engineers from Warsaw